The Granville Entertainment District is a neighbourhood in Downtown Vancouver known for its vast assortment of bars, danceclubs, restaurants, nightlife, and urban adult oriented shops and entertainment. The entertainment district centred on a seven-block stretch of the Granville Mall and surrounding streets.

History

The Vancouver city council originally came up with the concept of having most of the downtown's drinking establishments centred in one area in the late 1990s. The initiative came with an extension of late night liquor service to 3:00am, and according to Vancouver Police reports, has resulted in a steady increase of assaults and calls for police assistance in the area.

Prior to the establishment of the current Entertainment District, in what is now the Granville Mall was home to a number of movie theatres, which gave that stretch of Granville Street the nickname "Theatre Row" for many years. The closure of those theatres over the years (and the conversion of some of them into their current nightclub forms), however, has left no more movie theatres still operating in the former Theatre Row area as of November 4, 2012 (the date of the closure of the last remaining theatre there, the Granville 7 Cinemas).

Former Theatre Row
Capitol, 820 Granville (1920-1974, 1977-2005 as Capitol 6; demolished for the Capitol Residences condominium tower)
Caprice, 965 Granville (1912-1967 as Dominion, 1967-1988 as Downtown, 1992-1999; now the Caprice Nightclub)
Colonial, 603 Granville (1929-1972; demolished for the second phase of Pacific Centre)
Granville 7, 855 Granville (1913-1938 as Globe, 1938-1964 as Paradise, 1964-1986 as Coronet, 1987-2012; was the last remaining cinema complex on Granville Street before its closure. Still under the name Granville 7, most recently owned and operated by Empire Theatres.)
Lyric, 765 Granville (1891 - 1907 as Vancouver Opera House, 1913-1927 Orpheum, 1927-1935 Vancouver Theater, 1935-1947 and 1964-1969, 1947-1960 as International Cinema; demolished to make way for Eatons Department Store, now location of Nordstrom.)
Orpheum, 884 Granville (1927-1975; concert hall and home of the Vancouver Symphony Orchestra since 1977. Originally built as the New Orpheum)
Paradise, 919 Granville (1949-1972 and 1984-1989 as Studio, 1972-1978 as Eve, 1979-1981 as Lyric, 1981-1984 as Towne, 1989-1999; now the Studio Nightclub)
Plaza, 881 Granville (1908-1935 as the Maple Leaf, 1936-1963, 1988-1991 and 1993-1997, 1963-1987 as Odeon; now the Venue Nightclub)
Vancouver Centre, 650 West Georgia at Granville (1977-2002; now used by JLS Business College) (although officially addressed to West Georgia Street, technically part of Theatre Row due to its proximity with Granville. It basically sat on the site of the Strand and old Birks Building)
Vogue, 918 Granville (1941-1987; now a live theatre)

Sample Bars and Danceclubs
555 Vibes
AuBAR
Aura (formerly Barcelona Night Club)
Bar None
Cellar†
Cinema Public House
Club 816/The World (Afterhours club)
Colony Entertainment District (formerly Caprice Night Club)†
Commodore Ballroom
Doolins Irish Pub
Edge Social Grille and Lounge
Forum Sports Bar
Famous Warehouse
Gorg-O-Mish (Afterhours club)
Gossip (Formerly Plush Night Club)†
Granville Room
Joseph Richard†
The Lennox Pub
Mint (Formerly Cyber Night Club)
Mangos Kitchen Bar
The Orpheum Theatre
The Penthouse Night Club
The Red Room
Republic Night Club
The Roxy
Serontonin (Afterhours club)
Space Lounge
Speakeasy
Studio Night Club
Venue Night Club
Vogue Theatre
Yale Night Club

See also

Downtown Granville.com

Neighbourhoods in Vancouver
Culture of Vancouver
Tourist attractions in Vancouver
Entertainment districts in Canada